Turricostellaria apyrahi is a species of sea snail, a marine gastropod mollusk, in the family Costellariidae, the ribbed miters.

Distribution
This species occurs in the Atlantic Ocean off Southeast Brazil.

References

Costellariidae